The 2000 EPD Tour was the fourth season of the EPD Tour, one of four third-tier tours recognised by the European Tour.

Schedule
The following table lists official events during the 2000 season.

Order of Merit
The Order of Merit was based on prize money won during the season, calculated using a points-based system.

Notes

References

EPD Tour
European Tour